Anaxyrina cyanopa is a moth in the family Lecithoceridae. It was described by Edward Meyrick in 1918. It is found in southern India.

The wingspan is 12–13 mm. The forewings are ochreous-whitish, with the markings light fuscous irrorated black. There is a small spot on the base of the costa and a slender irregular sometimes incomplete transverse fascia near the base. A broad irregular fascia runs parallel to the termen before the middle, closely followed by a narrower irregular metallic-indigo-blue fascia edged black. There is a semi-oval blotch on the dorsum at two-thirds and a broad posterior light brownish band irrorated blackish on the lower half, leaving a narrow streak of groundcolour around the apex and termen, marked with three white dots on the costa and sprinkled white towards the costa posteriorly. The hindwings are pale grey.

References

Moths described in 1918
Torodorinae